Blood Hollow is a book written by William Kent Krueger and published by Atria Books, which later went on to win the Anthony Award for Best Novel in 2005.

References 

Anthony Award-winning works
American mystery novels
American thriller novels
2014 American novels
Atria Publishing Group books